Hear No Evil is the debut extended play by American rapper Young Thug. It was released on April 13, 2018, by 300 Entertainment and Atlantic Records. It features guest appearances from Nicki Minaj, Lil Uzi Vert, and 21 Savage, with production from Southside, DJ Spinz, Rex Kudo, and Charlie Handsome. The EP emphasizes deafness and sign language in its title, along with the video for "Anybody".

The album was supported by one single: "Anybody" featuring Nicki Minaj.

Background and release
The release of this project comes as a contradiction as Young Thug made a statement earlier in the year, stating:

On April 9, 2018 and April 10, 2018, Thug tweeted a couple of cryptic messages that simply read, "3" or "Three".

On April 11, 2018, Thug teased the music video for "Anybody" featuring Nicki Minaj, which was released in a sign language music video, ahead of the EP's release on April 12, 2018. It features an adolescent, a young man and a woman performing the song's lyrics in sign language.

On April 12, 2018, the cryptic messages was revealed as a 3-track EP. Thug revealed the EP's title and tracklist via Twitter.

The project is inspired by Thug's brother Deaf Greg, who is featured on the cover art.

Reception

Justin Sidhu of The Daily Californian praised the project's production and stated that it's more comfortable than the "unconventional" Beautiful Thugger Girls. For Sputnikmusic, Jordan M. wrote that Thug "has always delighted in doing everything a little weirder than everyone else; rather, Hear No Evil embodies the simple pleasure of hearing Thug spitting enigmatic non-sequiturs for a few songs more".

Track listing

Personnel
Credits adapted from Alex Tumay's Twitter.

Technical
 Joe LaPorta – mastering 
 Alex Tumay – mixing 
 Max Lord - recording

References

Young Thug albums
Atlantic Records albums
Albums produced by Southside (record producer)
2018 debut EPs
Atlantic Records EPs